Latsis can be either a Greek surname or a Russified form of the Latvian language surname Lācis. Individuals with the surname include:

Spiros Latsis (born 1946), Greek banking and oil tycoon
Yiannis Latsis (1910–2003), Greek shipping and oil tycoon
Martin Latsis (1888–1938), Latvian-born Soviet politician, revolutionary and state security high officer
Otto Latsis (1934–2005), Soviet and Russian journalist

See also 
 Latsis Foundation

Greek-language surnames
Russian-language surnames
Surnames of Latvian origin